Martin Knight (born 21 December 1957) is an English author.

Career
In 1999 Hoolifan and The Naughty Ninetie were released; both books dealing with the culture of football hooliganism. Knight was co-author with Martin King whose memoirs form the core of the books. Irvine Welsh provided the introduction to the latter book. As partners, Knight and King produced "On the Cobbles" the story of Jimmy Stockin a renowned gypsy prize fighter, "Ossie – King of The Bridge" – the autobiography of Chelsea footballing legend Peter Osgood and "Grass" covering the exploits of major drug smuggler and Howard Marks' cohort Phil Sparrowhawk. In 2010 a copy of "Ossie – King of the Bridge" (among other items) was buried beneath the new statue of Peter Osgood unveiled at Stamford Bridge.

In 2000 Knight produced his first novel "Common People". In 2003 he collaborated with George Best on his final memoirs before his death, "Scoring at Half Time". In 2004 "The Real Mackay" was released being the autobiography of Spurs, Derby and Scotland footballer Dave Mackay. 2006 saw the launch of "Battersea Girl" a partly fictionalised account of Knight's grandmother and an biography of Chelsea, Dundee and Aberdeen footballer Charlie Cooke.

In partnership with author John King, London Books was launched in 2006. King and Knight edited the company's first title "The Special Ones", a collection of memories and opinions of Chelsea fans and from 2007 books by vintage authors Gerald Kersh, James Curtis, Robert Westerby, Simon Blumenfeld, John Sommerfield and Alan Sillitoe were republished. In 2009 "Gypsy Joe: Bareknuckle Fighter and Professional Golfer" was selected by The Observer as their Sports Book of the Year.

In 2010, We Are Not Manslaughterers dealing with the events surrounding the Epsom Riot of 1919 was released.

Knight wrote the introduction to London Books 2014 release of There Ain't No Justice by James Curtis, first published in 1938 and filmed in 1939. The following year Knight contributed to More Raw Material - Work Inspired by Alan Sillitoe. Knight and John King became friends with Sillitoe and met up regularly in the last ten years of his life at The Lamb and Flag pub near Covent Garden. They were sometimes joined by other Sillitoe admirers such as Sean Bean and the meetings became known as The Flag Club.

Justice for Joan - The Arundel Murder was published in 2016. Knight investigates the circumstances surrounding the murder of Joan Woodhouse in Arundel in 1948. The case remains officially unsolved. In 2017, he wrote the afterword to the London Books' reissue of the Chelsea, Stoke, Arsenal and England maverick footballer Alan Hudson's autobiography The Working Man's Ballet.

Knight also had a long business career starting as a library assistant at the Financial Times and then working for Arab Banking Corporation in Bahrain before founding Presswatch Media now part of TNS and co-founding Precise Media which was sold to 3i in 2005.

In 2018, I Ran With The Gang: My Life In and Out of The Bay City Rollers was released, written with founding member Alan Longmuir. Longmuir died as the book was being finished.

Bibliography
 Alan Longmuir and Martin Knight. I Ran With The Gang: My Life In and Out of The Bay City Rollers (2018)

References

External links
  London Books
 We Are Not Manslaughterers at Tonto Books
 
 

1957 births
Living people
People from Epsom
English writers